The Big West men's basketball tournament (formerly the Pacific Coast Athletic Association men's basketball tournament) is the conference championship tournament in basketball for the Big West Conference.

It is a single-elimination tournament and seeding is based on regular season records.  Only the top eight teams in the conference qualify for the tournament. The winner receives the conference's automatic bid to the NCAA Men's Division I Basketball Championship. Prior to 1985, it was known as the PCAA (Pacific Coast Athletic Association) Tournament for the conference's former name.

Results

Pacific Coast Athletic Association

Big West Conference

Performance by school

 Italics: No longer a conference member

Broadcasters

Television

Radio

See also
Big West Conference women's basketball tournament
CCAA men's basketball tournament

References

 
Recurring sporting events established in 1976